The 1984 Nice International Open was a men's tennis tournament played on outdoor clay courts at the Nice Lawn Tennis Club in Nice, France, and was part of the 1984 Volvo Grand Prix. It was the 13th edition of the tournament and was held from 9 April through 15 April 1984. Fifth-seeded Andrés Gómez won the singles title.

Finals

Singles
 Andrés Gómez defeated  Henrik Sundström 6–1, 6–4
 It was Gómez' first singles title of the year and the fifth of his career.

Doubles
 Jan Gunnarsson /  Michael Mortensen defeated  Hans Gildemeister /  Andrés Gómez 6–1, 7–5

References

External links
 ITF tournament edition details

Nice International Open
1984
Nice International Open
Nice International Open
20th century in Nice